Tomaž Berločnik (born 1968) is a Slovenian business executive, mechanical engineer, and basketball administrator, currently serving as the CEO of the Slovenian company Petrol Group. Also, he is the president of the men's basketball club Cedevita Olimpija and former president of the basketball club Olimpija Ljubljana.

Early life and education 
Berločnik earned his bachelor's degree in mechanical engineering from the University of Ljubljana. At the same university, he earned his master's degree in business administration in 1997.

Business career 
After graduation, Berločnik continued his career as a project manager in the companies recovery department of the Slovenian Development Fund.

During the 2000s, Berločnik was a general manager for Slovenian companies Donit Tesnit and Berli. In February 2010, he became the chief executive officer for Istrabenz. He left Instabenz after one year.

On 1 February 2011, Berločnik became the chief executive officer and president of the management board for Petrol Group, the largest Slovenian oil distributing company. In February 2015, he is re-appointed for his second five-year term as the CEO of the company.

Berločnik was a member of the supervisory board for Slovenian companies Elan, Slovenske železnice, Telekom Slovenije, and Petrol.

Basketball administrator career 
In July 2017, Berločnik became the president of men's basketball team Olimpija Ljubljana. On 4 June 2019, Berločnik and Croatian businessman Emil Tedeschi announced that Croatian club Cedevita and Olimpija had planned to merge and form a new men's professional basketball club based in Ljubljana. During his tenure as the club's president, Olimpija won the 2017–18 Slovenian League championship.

On 8 July 2019, Berločnik was named the president of newly formed professional basketball club Cedevita Olimpija.

References

External links
 Tomaž Berločnik at LinkedIn
 Tomaž Berločnik at eurobasket.com

1968 births
Living people
KK Olimpija
KK Cedevita Olimpija executives
Slovenian businesspeople
Slovenian mechanical engineers
Slovenian sports executives and administrators
University of Ljubljana alumni